Dugginsville is an unincorporated community in southwestern Ozark County, Missouri, United States. It is located approximately five miles south of Theodosia, near Bull Shoals Lake and the Arkansas state line.

A post office called Dugginsville was established in 1894, and remained in operation until 1981. The community has the name of the local Duggins family.

References

Unincorporated communities in Ozark County, Missouri
Unincorporated communities in Missouri